The fourth season of The Bachelor premiered on 27 July 2016. This season features Richie Strahan, a 31-year-old Rope Access Technician from Perth, Western Australia, courting 25 women. Strahan previously appeared on the first season of The Bachelorette Australia featuring Sam Frost, where he finished in third place.

Contestants 
The season began with 22 contestants. In episode 7, three "intruders" were brought into the competition, bringing the total number of contestants to 25.

Call-out order 

 The contestant received the white rose, giving her the ability to spend extra time in a secret room with the Bachelor whenever she wishes.
 The contestant received a first impression rose.
 The contestant received a rose during a date.
 The contestant was eliminated.
 The contestant was eliminated during a date.
 The contestant quit the competition.
 The contestant was eliminated outside the rose ceremony.
 The contestant won the competition.

Episodes

Episode 1
Original airdate: 27 July 2016

Episode 2
Original airdate: 28 July 2016

Episode 3
Original airdate: 3 August 2016

Episode 4
Original airdate: 4 August 2016

Episode 5
Original airdate: 10 August 2016

Episode 6
Original airdate: 11 August 2016

Episode 7
Original airdate: 17 August 2016

Episode 8
Original airdate: 18 August 2016

Episode 9
Original airdate: 24 August 2016

Episode 10
Original airdate: 25 August 2016

Episode 11
Original airdate: 31 August 2016

Episode 12
Original airdate: 1 September 2016

Episode 13
Original airdate: 7 September 2016

Episode 14
Original airdate: 8 September 2016

Episode 15
Original airdate: 14 September 2016; filmed at Ubud, Bali, Indonesia

Episode 16
Original airdate: 15 September 2016; filmed at Ubud, Bali, Indonesia

Ratings

References

2016 Australian television seasons
Australian (season 04)
Television shows filmed in Australia
Television shows filmed in Indonesia